The Dublin Junior Hurling championship is the Junior Gaelic Athletic Association hurling competition of Dublin. The winners of the Junior championship go on to qualify for the Dublin Intermediate Hurling Championship in the following year. The winner will also represent Dublin GAA in the Special Section of the Leinster Junior Club Hurling Championship.

Roll of honour

Junior B Hurling Championship Roll of Honour

Junior C Hurling Championship Roll of Honour

Junior D Hurling Championship Roll of Honour

Junior E Hurling Championship Roll of Honour

Junior F Hurling Championship Roll of Honour
The 2020 Junior F Hurling Final was played between Castleknock and Fingallians in O'Toole Park.

Junior G Hurling Championship Roll of Honour
The first ever Junior G Hurling Championship between St Vincents and Thomas Davis was never played due to the Government Covid 19 restrictions. The 2021 Final was played between St Monica's and St Vincent's

Junior H Hurling Championship Roll of Honour
The first ever Junior H Hurling Championship Final was between Round Towers Clondalkin and Portobello

Notes and references

 Dublin GAA website

 4
Junior hurling county championships